Borá is a municipality in the state of São Paulo in Brazil. The population is 838 (2020 est.) in an area of 119 km². The elevation is 582 m. Borá is the least populated municipality in São Paulo and the second least populated in Brazil. Its foundation dates from around 1918, with the merchant Vedovatti family, being formally recognized in 1934, and becoming a municipality in 1965.

References

External links
 Borá municipality webpage in Brazilian Portuguese

Municipalities in São Paulo (state)